Darrtown is a census-designated place (CDP) in Milford Township, Butler County, Ohio, United States. The population was 516 at the 2010 census.

History
Darrtown was laid out in 1814 by Conrad Darr, and named for him. A post office called Darrtown was established in 1825, and remained in operation until 1907.

Geography
Darrtown is located in northwestern Butler County, in the southwest part of Milford Township, in the valley of Four Mile Creek.

Demographics

Notable person
 Walter Alston, former MLB player for the Saint Louis Cardinals and former manager for the Los Angeles Dodgers

References

External links
 Darrtown.com, community website

Census-designated places in Butler County, Ohio
1814 establishments in Ohio
Populated places established in 1814